Chesnut Cottage is a historic home located at Columbia, South Carolina. It was built between 1855 and 1860, and is a -story, Classical Revival style frame house, with a central dormer with an arched window. It features projecting front portico with octagonal columns and ironwork and wood balustrade. It was the home of General James Chesnut, Jr. and Mary Boykin Chesnut during the American Civil War period. In the fall of 1864, President Jefferson Davis was entertained at the home and made a speech from the front steps of the portico.

It was added to the National Register of Historic Places in 1971.

References

External links
Chesnut Cottage, Bed & Breakfast

Houses on the National Register of Historic Places in South Carolina
Neoclassical architecture in South Carolina
Houses completed in 1860
Houses in Columbia, South Carolina
National Register of Historic Places in Columbia, South Carolina